Elmer's Pet Rabbit is a 1941 Warner Bros. Merrie Melodies cartoon directed by Chuck Jones. The short was released on January 4, 1941, and features Elmer Fudd and Bugs Bunny.

This is the first cartoon in which the name Bugs Bunny is given (on a title card, edited onto the end of the opening title following the success of 1940's A Wild Hare), but the rabbit is similar to the prototype version of him seen and heard in Elmer's Candid Camera (though his voice is different) and other prototype-Bugs Bunny shorts. This is Chuck Jones' first cartoon featuring the recognizable Bugs Bunny, and it was written by Rich Hogan. Voices are provided by Mel Blanc and Arthur Q. Bryan. It was produced by Leon Schlesinger.

Plot

Elmer buys Bugs Bunny in a pet shop (for 98¢). When they get home, Elmer builds an enclosure for Bugs, and then serves him dinner (a bowl of vegetables) which Bugs acts angrily towards. Then Bugs is seen grumbling in the night and he eventually takes Elmer's bed as his own. Throughout the short, Bugs irritates Elmer in various ways—from dancing to attempts getting in the shower, etc.—which culminates when Elmer brutally attacks Bugs (in a dark room with humorous fireworks exploding) and sends him out of the house. However, Bugs somehow manages to get back inside and reclaim Elmer's bed, and the short ends with Elmer clicking the light off.

The song
The music in the cartoon includes a variation on "While Strolling Through the Park One Day," arranged by Carl Stalling, performed by Elmer and the rabbit. Elmer, of course, has trouble with many of the words, due to his "rounded L and R" speech impediment.

Home media
Although the short was included on three VHS compilations in 1985, 1990 and 1999, as well as a 1992 Golden Age of Looney Tunes LaserDisc release, it was not issued again until 2020, when HBO Max included the cartoon in its collection of other Looney Tunes shorts.

References

External links
 
 

1941 films
1941 short films
1941 comedy films
1941 animated films
1940s animated short films
1940s English-language films
1940s Warner Bros. animated short films
Merrie Melodies short films
Warner Bros. Cartoons animated short films
Short films directed by Chuck Jones
Films scored by Carl Stalling
Bugs Bunny films
Elmer Fudd films
Films about pets
Films produced by Leon Schlesinger